Cyle Christopher Larin (born 17 April 1995) is a Canadian professional soccer player who plays as a striker for the Spanish La Liga club Real Valladolid, on loan from the Belgian Pro League side Club Brugge.

After playing college soccer for the UConn Huskies, Larin was the first pick of the 2015 MLS SuperDraft, joining Orlando City. In his first MLS season, he broke the record for most goals by a rookie, scoring 17 in 27 games and earning the MLS Rookie of the Year Award. He totaled 89 games and 44 goals for Orlando before moving to Beşiktaş for an undisclosed fee in January 2018.

A full international for Canada since 2014, Larin represented the nation at the CONCACAF Gold Cup in 2015, 2017, 2019 and 2021, reaching the semi-finals at the last of those tournaments. He was the top scorer with 13 goals in the CONCACAF section of 2022 FIFA World Cup qualification, as Canada qualified for the first time since 1986. With 25 goals, he is the team's all-time top goalscorer.

Early life
Larin was born in Brampton, Ontario in Canada to a Jamaican family and attended St. Edmund Campion Secondary School, where he was the school's top goal scorer for the final three years that he attended. In 2007, at the age of 11, Larin joined the private soccer academy Sigma FC of the Ontario Soccer League before graduating in 2013. During his time at Sigma FC, Larin travelled to Europe for training periods with Werder Bremen, Hertha Berlin and Wolfsburg in Germany, as well as Racing Genk and Club Brugge in Belgium twice. About the striker, then-Sigma FC Technical Director Bobby Smyrniotis said, "Cyle is a rare player to find in Canada...a complete and modern striker able to play with both feet, finish from all areas, dominate his region of the park and provide for his teammates."

College career
In 2013, Larin committed to the University of Connecticut.  During his first year with the Huskies, Larin scored 14 goals in 23 appearances, the 6th highest goal total in the entire NCAA for the season. His performance during his freshman year earned him multiple honours including Freshman of the Year by TopDrawerSoccer.com and being named to the American Athletic Conference All-Rookie Team. In January 2014, Larin was touted as one of the best players available in the 2014 MLS SuperDraft. However, he did not sign a Generation Adidas deal with Major League Soccer before the draft and was named the No. 2 best college player available in 2015 if he opted to sign with the league.

In 2014, during the college offseason, Larin rejoined Sigma FC as they entered the newly formed League1 Ontario. During the season, Larin scored four goals for Sigma. During the season, Sigma FC reached the League 1 Ontario Cup final before ultimately losing 1–2 to Vaughan Azzurri. Following the 2014 Major League Soccer regular season and during his sophomore season at UConn, Larin was once again predicted to be the No. 1 pick in the upcoming 2015 MLS Superdraft if he opted to sign with the league and not for a European club, which were also rumoured to be interested in the player. At that time, Orlando City SC held the No. 1 pick in the draft after selecting it in the Expansion Draft held between themselves and fellow-expansion club New York City FC.

Club career

Orlando City

2015 season
In early January 2015, it was announced that Larin had reached a verbal agreement to sign a Generation Adidas contract with Major League Soccer despite interest from European clubs, including a club from the English Premier League. On January 8, 2015, it was officially announced that Larin had signed a Generation Adidas contract with the league, along with four other players. At the 2015 MLS SuperDraft, Larin was selected by Orlando City SC as the first overall pick as expected, becoming the first Canadian ever chosen first overall in the MLS SuperDraft in the process.

Larin was first included in an Orlando City match on March 13, 2015, remaining an unused substitute in their 1–0 win at the Houston Dynamo. Eight days later he made his debut, coming on as a 71st-minute substitute for Pedro Ribeiro in a 0–1 loss against Vancouver Whitecaps FC at the Citrus Bowl. He scored his first professional league goal on April 12, opening a 2–0 away win against the Portland Timbers. Larin scored in his Lamar Hunt U.S. Open Cup debut as Orlando was defeated 1–3 by Chicago Fire in the quarterfinals.  On July 18, in a 0–2 home loss to the New York Red Bulls, he was sent off in the first half for a high tackle on Sacha Kljestan; this red card was eventually overturned.

Eight days later, he scored his first professional hat-trick in an MLS fixture against New York City FC. With the hat-trick, Larin became only the 8th rookie to score three goals in an MLS match and only the third player to do so for an expansion side. Larin also became the third Canadian to score three goals in a match, along with Dwayne De Rosario and Tesho Akindele, and the second youngest player to do so behind only Kekuta Manneh, who was 18 at the time of his first MLS hat-trick. He was named MLS Player of the Week for his efforts.

In Orlando's next match, Larin scored two more goals as the club defeated Columbus Crew SC 5–2, tying him with Damani Ralph's rookie record of eleven goals. 
On September 25, against the Red Bulls, he scored his second hat-trick of the season in a 5–2 victory on the road and, in the process, broke the rookie goal-scoring record. In November, having finished his first season with 17 goals in 27 games, Larin won the 2015 MLS Rookie of the Year Award.

2016 season
On March 6, Orlando began the new season by hosting Real Salt Lake. Down 2–0 in the fourth minute of added time, Larin scored from Brek Shea's pass and then set up Adrian Winter's equalizer in the eventual 2–2 draw. He scored in each of the team's first three games of the season, the third being the only goal in a win at New York City on March 18.

Larin was selected for the 2016 MLS All-Star Game in San Jose, California, coming on in place of Sebastian Giovinco for the final 14 minutes of a 2–1 loss to England's Arsenal.

2017 season
Larin scored the first three goals of Orlando's 2017 season, including a brace against Philadelphia. In the early hours of Thursday, June 15, Larin was arrested and charged with DUI. As a result, he missed three games while under assessment by MLS. After scoring 12 goals in the 2017 season, Larin indicated a desire to move to Europe in the offseason. His last match with Orlando City was a friendly match against Puerto Rico to raise money for the devastation caused by Hurricane María where he scored two goals.

Beşiktaş
Larin was sold to Beşiktaş in Turkey in January 2018, after refusing to show up to practice with Orlando City, with whom he was still under contract. The transfer fee was undisclosed. On April 7, Larin scored on his debut with Beşiktaş in a 5–1 home Süper Lig win over Göztepe, minutes after entering as a late substitute.  In the last game of the season on May 19, he scored a hat-trick in a 5–1 win over Sivasspor also at the Vodafone Park.

In the second leg of the second qualifying round against the Faroese side B36 Torshavn in the 2018–19 UEFA Europa League, Larin scored three goals in a 6–0 win (8–0 aggregate) on August 2. This made him the second player after Demba Ba to bag a hat-trick for the Black Eagles in a European competition.

After a difficult 2018–19 season with Beşiktaş, Larin was loaned to Belgian club Zulte Waregem in July 2019. He scored seven times in his season in the Belgian First Division A, including two in a 6–0 win over Cercle Brugge on October 5.

After returning to his parent club, on November 29, 2020, Larin was sent off in a 4–3 home win against Istanbul rivals Fenerbahçe. The following January 6, he scored four times in a 6–0 win over Çaykur Rizespor also at Vodafone Park, and repeated the feat in a 7–0 win over Hatayspor on May 1. He ended the season as a league champion and joint-second top scorer with 19 goals, behind Aaron Boupendza and alongside Mame Biram Diouf, both of Hatayspor.

Club Brugge
On July 4, 2022, Larin signed a three-year deal with the Belgian First Division A club Club Brugge. He made his debut on July 17 in Brugge's Belgian Super Cup match against Gent, subbing in the second half in an eventual 1–0 victory. Larin scored his first goal on September 10 against Seraing.

In January 2023, Larin was loaned to La Liga side Valladolid for the remainder of the season, with an option to buy. He made his debut on January 29 against Valencia, scoring the only goal in a 1–0 victory despite coming on as a late substitute. He scored again in a 0–1 victory on 5 February against Real Sociedad.

International career

After Larin's impressive first-year season at the University of Connecticut, Canada national team manager Benito Floro called him in for a senior national training camp in Florida in January 2014 — Larin's first national callup at any level, senior or junior. In May 2014, Larin was included in the roster for a senior training camp in Austria and friendly matches against Bulgaria and Moldova on May 23 and 27, respectively. Larin was viewed as a potential offensive solution for the team which was experiencing a scoring drought of over 900 minutes and winless streak of 15 games entering the friendlies. He made his senior international debut in the match against Bulgaria in Ritzing, coming on as a substitute for Simeon Jackson later in the second half of a 1–1 draw.

Larin was named in Canada's 2015 CONCACAF U-20 Championship squad on January 5 that year. Five days later, he made his tournament debut in a 3–1 win over Haiti, as Canada exited in the group stage in Jamaica. He returned to the senior team for friendlies against Guatemala and Puerto Rico in March. He scored his first goal for Canada in the latter match, the third goal in the 3–0 victory over Puerto Rico.

In June, Larin netted in each leg of Canada's 6–0 aggregate win over Dominica in the second round of qualification for the 2018 FIFA World Cup. Larin featured in all three of Canada's matches in their co-hosting of the 2015 CONCACAF Gold Cup, the first two as a starter, in a group stage exit. In the team's opening game of the tournament on July 8 at the StubHub Center, he missed an open goal in a goalless draw with El Salvador. On November 13, in the first match of the fourth round of qualification, he scored the only goal to defeat Honduras at BC Place in Vancouver.

Larin was not named in manager Octavio Zambrano's initial Canada squad for the 2017 CONCACAF Gold Cup due to his recent charge for driving under the influence, but was named in the squad for the knockout stage. He started in the quarter-final against Jamaica at the University of Phoenix Stadium, and was substituted for Lucas Cavallini after 56 minutes of the 2–1 loss.

Larin was named to the final 23-man squad for the 2019 CONCACAF Gold Cup on May 30, 2019.

On March 25, 2021, Larin scored his first hat-trick with Canada, in a 5–1 win over Bermuda in the team's first 2022 World Cup qualifying match. He was called up for the 2021 CONCACAF Gold Cup on July 1. He scored the equalizer in the team's opening 4–1 win over Martinique and two goals in a victory by the same score over Haiti, as they reached the semi-finals; the brace in the latter game put him at 10 goals in 8 games in 2021.

Larin tied Dwayne De Rosario's record for most goals for Canada (22) on November 16, 2021, scoring twice in a 2–1 home win over Mexico in 2022 World Cup qualifying, a team Canada had not beaten for 21 years. On January 30, 2022, he scored the opening goal of a 2–0 home win in a qualifier against the United States, surpassing De Rosario's record and became the all-time top goalscorer for Canada. On March 27, he opened the scoring in a 4–0 win over Jamaica as the Canadians made the World Cup for the first time since 1986. He finished the qualification campaign with 13 goals, the highest in the CONCACAF region. In November 2022, Larin was confirmed as part of the 26-man squad for the 2022 FIFA World Cup.

Personal life
Larin holds a U.S. green card, which qualifies him as a domestic player for MLS roster purposes.

In June 2017, Larin was arrested by Florida Highway Patrol for driving the wrong way on a 4-lane road in Orlando and given a breathalyzer test that showed that he was above the legal blood alcohol level. He was suspended from MLS until he completed a league-mandated substance abuse assessment, and this ban was lifted by the end of the month.

In August 2021, Larin joined Canadian club Simcoe County Rovers of League1 Ontario as a co-owner.

Career statistics

Club

International

 Scores and results list Canada's goal tally first, score column indicates score after each Larin goal.

Honours
Beşiktaş
Süper Lig: 2020–21
Turkish Cup: 2020–21
Turkish Super Cup: 2021

Club Brugge
 Belgian Super Cup: 2022

Individual
Süper Lig Striker of the Year: 2020–21
 MLS All-Star: 2016
 MLS Rookie of the Year Award: 2015
 American Athletic Conference Offensive Player of the Year: 2014
 American Athletic Conference Rookie of the Year: 2013

References

External links

 
 

1995 births
Living people
Association football forwards
All-American men's college soccer players
Canadian soccer players
Canadian sportspeople of Jamaican descent
Black Canadian soccer players
Canadian expatriate soccer players
Expatriate soccer players in the United States
Canadian expatriate sportspeople in the United States
Expatriate footballers in Turkey
Canadian expatriate sportspeople in Turkey
Expatriate footballers in Belgium
Canadian expatriate sportspeople in Belgium
Expatriate footballers in Spain
Canadian expatriate sportspeople in Spain
UConn Huskies men's soccer players
Orlando City SC players
Beşiktaş J.K. footballers
S.V. Zulte Waregem players
Orlando City SC draft picks
Real Valladolid players
League1 Ontario players
Major League Soccer first-overall draft picks
Major League Soccer players
Süper Lig players
Major League Soccer All-Stars
Belgian Pro League players
Canada men's youth international soccer players
Canada men's international soccer players
2015 CONCACAF U-20 Championship players
2015 CONCACAF Gold Cup players
2017 CONCACAF Gold Cup players
2019 CONCACAF Gold Cup players
2021 CONCACAF Gold Cup players
2022 FIFA World Cup players
Sigma FC players
Soccer players from Brampton
Simcoe County Rovers FC owners